Peter Hogan (28 November 1945 – 1 December 2007) was  a former Australian rules footballer who played with Richmond in the Victorian Football League (VFL).

Notes

External links 		
		
		
		
		
		
		
		
1945 births		
2007 deaths		
Australian rules footballers from Victoria (Australia)		
Richmond Football Club players
Portland Football Club players